Trunk Line Bridge No. 237 is a concrete arch bridge in Ransom Township, Michigan, that carries Burt Road over Silver Creek. Built in 1918, it is listed on the National Register of Historic Places.

History
A thoroughfare existed along the current route of Burt Road as early as 1894. By the time of the bridge's construction, this route formed part of the east-west State Highway No. 308. The bridge was built in 1918 by the Michigan State Highway Department according to a standard plan. The Pioneer, Ohio-based company Beighton and Spaulding served as contractor.

The bridge was listed on the National Register of Historic Places on January 14, 2000.

Design and location
The bridge is a concrete, barrel vaulted deck arch bridge. The bridge carries the unpaved Burt Road in a rural, wooded area of Ransom Township in Hillsdale County. The parapet railings are constructed of solid concrete and have five rectangular recesses on the inside and outside faces. At the southwest corner is affixed a bridge plate on the inside of the railing.

See also

List of bridges on the National Register of Historic Places in Michigan
National Register of Historic Places listings in Hillsdale County, Michigan

References

Road bridges on the National Register of Historic Places in Michigan
Transportation in Hillsdale County, Michigan
Deck arch bridges in the United States
Bridges completed in 1918
1918 establishments in Michigan
National Register of Historic Places in Hillsdale County, Michigan
Concrete bridges in the United States
Buildings and structures in Hillsdale County, Michigan